Jon Andoni Pérez Alonso (born 5 March 1974), known as Bolo, is a Spanish football manager and former player who played as a centre-forward.

In a 15-year professional career, in which he represented six clubs, he appeared in 479 games in the two major levels of Spanish football, scoring 95 goals. He amassed totals of 168 matches and 29 goals in La Liga, with Athletic Bilbao and Rayo Vallecano (four seasons apiece).

Playing career

Club
Born in Bilbao, Biscay, Bolo was a product of Lezama, Athletic Bilbao's youth structure. He first appeared with the first team on 20 February 1994 in a 1–0 away defeat against Real Zaragoza, in what would be his sole La Liga appearance of the season.

After a four-year stint with the Basques (with loans to CA Osasuna and Hércules CF in the Segunda División included), Bolo went on to play for Rayo Vallecano where he had his most steady period, appearing in the UEFA Cup in the 2000–01 campaign and being joint-top scorer (alongside Dimitar Berbatov) with seven goals to help his team reach the semi-finals; at times, he formed part of a forward line alongside two Bosnian internationals with very similar names: 'Baljić, Bolić and Bolo'. He suffered consecutive relegations in his last two years, at Gimnàstic de Tarragona and CD Numancia.

In August 2008, Bolo was released by Numancia as the Soria team returned to the top flight, and returned to the Basque region, signing with Segunda División B side Barakaldo CF. After only one season, he retired from football at the age of 35, becoming his last club's general manager.

International
Bolo was never capped by Spain at any level, but represented the Basque Country's non-FIFA team. On 27 December 2003, he scored both goals in a 2–1 win over Uruguay at his hometown's San Mamés Stadium.

Coaching career
Bolo was appointed manager of Arenas Club de Getxo on 18 March 2014, achieving promotion to division three in his first full season. On 31 May 2018, he was named at the helm of SD Ponferradina also in the third tier, winning another promotion in his debut campaign.

On 27 May 2022, after nearly four years in charge of Ponfe, Bolo announced that he would leave the club at the end of the season. On 15 June, he took over fellow second division side Real Oviedo, being dismissed on 16 October.

Personal life
Bolo's son, Adrián (born in Madrid in 2001 while his father was with Rayo), is also a footballer. A central defender, he also came through at Athletic Bilbao.

Managerial statistics

Honours
Numancia
Segunda División: 2007–08

Individual
UEFA Cup top scorer: 2000–01 (joint)

References

External links

1974 births
Living people
Spanish footballers
Footballers from Bilbao
Association football forwards
La Liga players
Segunda División players
Segunda División B players
Danok Bat CF players
Bilbao Athletic footballers
Athletic Bilbao footballers
CA Osasuna players
Hércules CF players
Rayo Vallecano players
Gimnàstic de Tarragona footballers
CD Numancia players
Barakaldo CF footballers
Basque Country international footballers
Spanish football managers
Segunda División managers
Segunda División B managers
Tercera División managers
Arenas Club de Getxo managers
SD Ponferradina managers
Real Oviedo managers